St. James is a provincial electoral division in the Canadian province of Manitoba.

Historical riding
The original St. James riding was established at the province's creation in 1870, and lasted until the election of 1879.  It was located in what was then a separate community on Winnipeg's periphery.

List of provincial representatives

Modern riding
The modern St. James riding was created by redistribution in 1957 out of part of Assiniboia, and has formally existed since the provincial election of 1958.  The riding is located in the western section of Winnipeg.

St. James is bordered on the east by Wellington, Minto and Wolseley, to the south by Tuxedo, to the north by Wellington and Lakeside, and to the west by Assiniboia and Kirkfield Park.

The riding's population in 1996 was 20,417.  In 1999, the average family income was $47,842, and the unemployment rate was 6.20%.  Almost 19% of St. James's population is over 65 years of age, and almost 38% of dwelling units are rented.

The service sector accounts for 15% of St. James's industry, following by government services (14%) and manufacturing (13%).

St. James was a marginal Progressive Conservative/NDP riding for most of its history to 1988.  It was won in that year by Liberal Paul Edwards, who was elected leader of his party in 1993.  The NDP recaptured the seat in 1995.

Recent boundary changes
The St. James riding underwent a dramatic redistribution in 1999. Previously, the space the riding occupied roughly the same space as the riding of Minto, which was newly created that year and, as of 2019, exists as Notre Dame. In fact, the original plan of the Manitoba Electoral Boundaries Commission in 1999 was to rename St. James as Minto, and create a new riding called King Edward to its immediate west (primarily from the old riding of Sturgeon Creek). Instead, the boundaries legislation passed by the Manitoba legislature in 1999 determined that the new riding would be called St. James.

Although the current riding has some territory in common with its predecessor of the same name, it is probably more accurately regarded as the successor riding to Sturgeon Creek. The NDP captured this seat from the Tories in 1999, and retained it in 2003.

List of provincial representatives

Electoral results

1870 general election

1874 general election

1878 general election

1958 general election

1959 general election

1962 general election

1966 general election

1969 general election

1973 general election

1977 general election

1981 general election

1986 general election

1988 general election

1990 general election

1995 general election

1999 general election

2003 general election

2007 general election

2011 general election

2016 general election

2019 general election

Previous boundaries

References

Manitoba provincial electoral districts
Politics of Winnipeg